Shigeaki (written: 茂章, 茂昭, 成章, 成亮, 成彬, 成彰 or 重昭) is a masculine Japanese given name. Notable people with the name include:

, Japanese basketball player
, Japanese racing driver
, Japanese politician and businessman
, Japanese idol and singer
, Japanese historian
, Japanese composer
, Japanese modern pentathlete
, Japanese luger
, Japanese Go player

Japanese masculine given names